Air Wales was an airline operating flights between Cardiff International Airport and Hawarden Airport in Flintshire commencing in 1977 and ending 18 months later.

History 
Air Wales was founded in August 1977 by aircraft brokers DK Aviation and Orbit Trust. It began operations at Cardiff Airport on 6 December 1977 using a 9-seater Piper PA-31 Navajo Chieftain (G-BWAL) on its twice-daily scheduled route from Cardiff to Chester (Hawarden Airport).

Clwyd County Council provided the company with a start-up grant of £10,000 on the grounds that the service would improve communications between North East Wales and Cardiff. The single fare was £16.50p. Notwithstanding the confined space of the aircraft, complimentary coffee was routinely served in-flight to passengers by the First Officer. The airline added services from Cardiff to Cherbourg-en-Cotentin and Brest in France.

In 1978, an Embraer EMB-110 Bandeirante (G-CELT) was added to the fleet to operate a service from Cardiff to Brussels connecting into Sabena's network. The airline was granted permission to operate twice daily between Cardiff and London-Gatwick.

With break-even estimated at some 15 months away, Air Wales, unable to raise sufficient working capital, ceased operations on 30 June 1979 and became part of Air Anglia and ultimately part of Air UK.

Fleet

See also 
 Air Wales
 List of defunct airlines of the United Kingdom

References 

Defunct airlines of the United Kingdom
Organisations based in Wales